The Drinker's Dictionary is a list of 228 "round-about phrases" to describe drunkenness.  It was published January 6, 1737 (1736 Old Style) in The Pennsylvania Gazette.  The Pennsylvania Gazette publication is attributed to Benjamin Franklin and appears in his memoirs; however, a very similar wordlist appears in the New England Weekly Journal on July 6, 1736, and differences between the two suggest earlier origins by a different author. Franklin deemed drunkenness as a vice that could never be a virtue, so various terms and phrases were created to mask the inappropriateness of the act.

References

Bibliography
Franklin, Benjamin, Franklin, William Temple, Duane, William, Memoirs of Benjamin Franklin, volume 2, New York: Derby & Jackson (1859), p. 496.

External links 
Internet Archive text of the Memoirs of Benjamin Franklin

1737 books
English dictionaries
Works by Benjamin Franklin